The 1955 World Table Tennis Championships women's doubles was the 21st edition of the women's doubles championship.
Ella Zeller and Angelica Rozeanu defeated Diane Rowe and Rosalind Rowe in the final by three sets to two.

Results

See also
 List of World Table Tennis Championships medalists

References

-
1955 in women's table tennis